Park Yun-bae (born 23 September 1979) is a South Korean biathlete. He competed in the men's 20 km individual event at the 2006 Winter Olympics.

References

1979 births
Living people
South Korean male biathletes
Olympic biathletes of South Korea
Biathletes at the 2006 Winter Olympics
Place of birth missing (living people)
Asian Games medalists in biathlon
Biathletes at the 2003 Asian Winter Games
Biathletes at the 2007 Asian Winter Games
Asian Games silver medalists for South Korea
Medalists at the 2003 Asian Winter Games
20th-century South Korean people
21st-century South Korean people